Nanjing 1937: A Love Story is a 1996 romantic novel written by Ye Zhaoyan. Originally published in Chinese by Jiangsu Art and Literature Press, it was translated into English by Matthew Berry and published by Columbia University Press in December 2002.

Background and publication

Research
While preparing to write the novel, Ye consulted various primary and secondary historical sources. Throughout the story, Ye details every political and military development from 1 January 1937 until the Nanjing Massacre on 13 December of the same year, including "petty tabloid gossip" and minor cultural events, to create a "historical chronology".

Publication
Nanjing 1937 was originally published in China in 1996 by Jiangsu Art and Literature Press. It was later translated into English by Matthew Berry and published by Columbia University Press in December 2002.

Summary
The book tells the story of Ding Wenyu, a narcissistic language professor, and his affair with Ren Yuyuan, a young married Sino-Japanese woman. As the relationship between the two develops, it echoes the surrounding acts of war, but remains focused on the "domestic and trivial". After the death of Yuyuan's husband, the book ends with the two main characters fleeing Nanjing on the eve of the Massacre.

Ding Wenyu is a Chinese professor who was educated in the West. Described by The Independent as a "spineless antihero", he is guided spiritually by the characters created by Lu Xun and Lao She. Ding has been suggested as a metaphor for the Chinese national character, and considers his actions in a military-like way.

Critical analysis
Despite the events of the book occurring during the Battle of Nanjing, Ye tackles the conflict in a way that differs from the typical nationalist view present in China. Instead of focusing on the "rape" of China by Japanese forces, he explores the relationship between a Chinese man and Sino-Japanese woman: love is the focus of the novel, not war. While there is violence present in the novel, the majority of it is domestic and focuses on the actions of Chinese people against each other, from abuse to murder. The only description of war violence comes in the final scenes of the novel, when Ding and Yuyuan flee from Nanjing: he is killed in the Japanese attack.

Anticipating the possibility of censorship due to his unorthodox approach, Ye wrote in the foreword: "I write this novel without any regard for what the consequences might be; heaven only knows if anyone will see it."

Reception
When Nanjing 1937 was published in China, it became a bestseller.

References

1996 Chinese novels
Chinese romance novels
Novels set in the 1930s
Chinese historical novels
Novels set in Nanjing